The Korea International Boat Show (KIBS) is one of the three biggest boat shows in Asia, representing the Korean marine leisure industry. The latest edition of KIBS was held jointly from 19 to 22 May 2016, at KINTEX, with the associated Asia Marine Conference. Despite the Sewol ferry disaster and the rising public concern on maritime safety, many exhibitors remained confident about the Korean market's potential. The convention brought together 240 exhibitors and buyers from 40 countries, and occupied a gross exhibition area of 57,557 m2.

Upcoming shows 

 Date: 26-28 March 2021
 Time: From 10:00 to 18:00
 Venue: KINTEX, Ilsanseo-gu, Goyang-si, Gyeonggi Province Republic of Korea
 Host: Ministry of Oceans and Fisheries, Gyeonggi Province
 Organizer: KINTEX, Korea Trade Promotion Corporation (KOTRA) Waterway+, Marina and Marine Industries Association of Korea

Past events 
 KIBS 2018 / May 24-27 / KINTEX & Gimpo Ara Marina
 KIBS 2017 / May 25-28 / KINTEX & Gimpo Ara Marina
 KIBS 2016 / May 22-25 / KINTEX
 KIBS 2015 / May 25 - 28 / KINTEX
 KIBS 2014 / June 12 - 15 / KINTEX
 KIBS 2013 / May 30 - June 2 / KINTEX
 KIBS 2012 / May 30 - June 3 / Jeongok & Tando Port, Gyeonggi Province
 KIBS 2011 / June 8 - 12 / Jeongok & Tando Port, Gyeonggi Province
 KIBS 2010 / June 9 - 13 / Jeongok & Tando Port, Gyeonggi Province
 KIBS 2009 / June 3 - 7 / Jeongok & Tando Port, Gyeonggi Province
 KIBS 2008 / June 11 - 15 / Jeongok & Tando Port, Gyeonggi Province

Accreditation 
 International Endorsed Exhibition by MOTIE Ministry of Trade, Investment and Energy), 2010
 IFBSO (International Federation of Boat Show Organizers) Platinum Member, 2011
 ICOMIA (Int'l Council of Marine Industry Associations) Member, 2012
 Trade Fair Certification by the U.S. Department of Commerce, 2014

Exhibition profile 
 Small and large boats and yachts
 Canoes, kayaks, rowboats, water-skis, PWCs, trailers and campers
 Marine engines, propulsion, engine parts and controllers
 Navigation, communication and electronic equipment
 Maintenance and troubleshooting solutions
 Boat and yacht interiors and exteriors
 Wakeboards and windsurf boards
 Diving equipment and services
 fishing tackle, accessories and services
 Marine apparel, books and life vests

External links

External links 
 Korea International Boat Show 2021/ Publication in Marinas-reviews 
Boat shows
Annual events in South Korea
Fairs in South Korea